Donnison is a surname. Notable people with the surname include:

David Donnison (1926–2018), British academic and social scientist
Ella Donnison (born 1975), English women's cricketer

See also
10455 Donnison, a main-belt asteroid
Dennison (surname)